The following ships of the Indian Navy have been named Godavari:

  was a Black Swan-class sloop commissioned into the Royal Indian Navy in 1943, where she served in World War II, and transferred to Pakistan in 1948
  was a Type II Hunt-class destroyer, formerly HMS Bedale of the Royal Navy where she served in World War II. Commissioned into the Indian Navy in 1953, she was decommissioned and scrapped in 1979.
  was the lead vessel of her class of guided-missile frigates. Commissioned in 1983, she was decommissioned in 2015.

Indian Navy ship names